Bathybembix galapagana is a species of sea snail, a marine gastropod mollusk in the family Eucyclidae.

References

 W.H. Dall (1908), The Mollusca and the Brachiopoda; Bulletin of the Museum of Comparative Zoology vol. XLIII no. 6, 1908; pl. 3 # 5, 7

External links
 To World Register of Marine Species

galapagana
Gastropods described in 1908